The 1998 Peach Bowl may refer to:

 1998 Peach Bowl (January), January 2, 1998, game between the Clemson Tigers and the Auburn Tigers
 1998 Peach Bowl (December), December 31, 1998, game between the Georgia Bulldogs and the Virginia Cavaliers